Short time may refer to:

 Short-time working, in which employees agree to a reduction in working time and pay;
 Short Time, a 1990 comedy action crime film;
 Lee Dae-ro Can't Die, a 2005 South Korean action film also known as Short Time;
 The Short-Timers, a 1979 novel by U.S. Marine Corps veteran Gustav Hasford;